Ichoria mexicana is a moth of the subfamily Arctiinae. It was described by Max Wilhelm Karl Draudt in 1931. It is found in Mexico.

References

 

Arctiinae
Moths described in 1931